Kallil Temple is a hindu temple located at Kerala, South India. It is 8 km away from Perumbavoor  in Ernakulam district of Kerala. Kallil in Malayalam means 'in stone'. It is one of the most ancient hindu temple in Kerala. It is one of the protected monuments in Kerala under Kerala State Department of Archaeology.

Overview 
The temple, located in a 28-acre (113,000 m2) plot, is cut from a huge rock, and a climb of 120 steps leads to the temple. To reach the temple one has to travel a distance of about 2 km from Odakkali, on the Aluva Munnar Road and 10 km from Perumbavoor. The temple is owned by the Kallil Pisharody family. The present Karanavar of the family turned over all the administrative control of the temple and all its belongings to 'Chenkottukonam Sree Ramadasashramam'. But all that retrieved back due to some hassle between local people and Ashram authorities.

Location

The temple is located at Methala near Perumbavoor in Ernakulam district.  The temple is located at a distance of 10 km from Perumbavoor.  It is located at a distance of 4 km from Odakali between Perumbavoor and Kothamangalam.

Kallil Bhagavathi Temple

There are many temples where history and legend converge.  The temples that still stand tall today with unbelievable stories and myths that overcome it.  The Kallil Bhagwati Temple is one such temple.  The story of the Kallil Bhagwati Temple is located in the village of Methala near Perumbavoor in Ernakulam district.  To the highlights of the Kallil Bhagavathi Temple, which is believed to be over five thousand years old and has become a part of the history of Kerala itself !!!

Perumbavoor is famous for its stone Bhagavathi Temple, which can be reached by crossing over a hundred steps in the jungle.  The temple is said to be over five thousand years old and is marked by Perumbavoor on the temple map.  It is now preserved as a protected monument under the Archaeological Department.

Legend

If you search for the history of the Kallil Temple, you will come across Jainism.  It is believed that this was a Jain temple in the early days.  It is believed that Padmavati, the Yakshiya of Jainism, is worshiped here as Bhagwati.  It is believed that the Jain temple later became the Bhagwati temple.  It is believed that this change took place in the ninth century. The legend spread here is related to a woman.  Once upon a time, people came to the forest and saw a woman of extraordinary beauty.  They disappeared when he went to see them playing with stones.  They hide in the cave with the stones they were playing with.  It is believed that the goddess was Bhagwati.  It is believed that the stone that went up while the goddess was playing became the roof of the temple and came down as a seat.The stones that were worshiped by the Goddess are still here today ... The huge rock that stands on the roof of the shrine does not touch the ground.  This rock that stands tall in the air does not move even if 15 elephants pull it together!

The two most important vows here are the stone vow and the broom vow.  The broom vows are made for women to grow hair and for men to change family troubles.  The broom vow is made of wool without touching the iron and offered to the temple.

The stone vows to complete the housework that was stopped half way.  If you bring two or three stones from the house where the work is being done and bring them to the temple for prayers, the work will be completed within a year.  People who can do whatever they want come here and give thanks again and make vows and pray.

Cave Temple

This temple is also known as the Kallil Cave Temple.  The Goddess is enshrined in a cave made of stone.  As it is a cave temple, it is not possible to walk around behind the shrine like in normal temples.  Therefore, when circling Bhagwati, the circumambulation is completed by bowing to the stone.There is ample evidence that this was a Jain temple in the early days.  The idols of Parshvanath and Mahavira in Jainism have become idols of Lord Shiva and Lord Vishnu.

Pooja time

The festival is celebrated on the Karthika day in the month of Scorpio.  The festival lasts for eight days.

Until a few days ago, it was customary to walk after noon pooja.

This was due to the difficulty of returning so far for evening poojas.  But now even though the walk is closed for noon pooja, the walk is reopened for evening devotional and Athazha pooja.

Main deity 

Rock-carved images of the 23rd Tirthankara, Parshvanatha, Vardhaman Mahavira (24th Tirthankara) and Padmavati devi are present in the temple. Padmavati devi is worshipped as Bhagawathi by the local population. The major festival of the temple is celebrated from Karthika of month Vrishchika and usually lasts for a week.

Gallery

See also
Jainism in Kerala
List of Jain temples

References

External links

kallil
Kallil temple's official website

Jain temples in Kerala
9th-century Jain temples
Religious buildings and structures in Ernakulam district
Monuments and memorials in Kerala
Rock formations of India